Karczyn may refer to the following places in Poland:
Karczyn, Lower Silesian Voivodeship (south-west Poland)
Karczyn, Kuyavian-Pomeranian Voivodeship (north-central Poland)
Karczyn, Lubusz Voivodeship (west Poland)